The Convertors were a line of action figures manufactured by Select in the 1980s.

Often compared to the more famous Gobots and Transformers, the Convertors were a line of toys which came out at about the same time and also featured transforming robots.

History
The Convertors licensed some of their toy designs from Bandai just as was done for the Transformers, meaning some of the toys looked very similar. The molds for Convertors were later knocked off by other toy companies. Convertors toys were featured in a display in the 1985 J. C. Penney Christmas catalog.

Fiction
The Convertors toys featured the conflict between heroic and evil factions, in this case the heroic Defenders (and their Avarian allies) and the evil Maladroids (and their Insectors allies).

Toys

Various toys were released in different size classes and price points for the Convertors line.

Avarians
Calypso - parrot
Feathers - peacock
Hoot - owl
Rex - blue robot eagle
Robat - black robot bat

Defenders
Standard Defenders
Chopper - helicopter - licensed from Special Armored Battalion Dorvack
Fast Track - train engine - licensed from Galactic Whirlwind Sasuraiger
Tanker - tank - licensed from Special Armored Battalion Dorvack
Wheels - off road vehicle - licensed from Special Armored Battalion Dorvack
Motorized Defenders
Argonaut - boat
Atlantis - boat
Cpt. Nemo - boat
Neptune - boat
Super Defenders
D.A. Tona - white car
Indy- blue and white car - similar to Chō Kōsoku Galvion
Monty Carlo - blue car
X - red car
Jumbo Defenders
Bull - red bulldozer
Mini-Bots
City - red Honda City Turbo - similar to the Diaclone Skids toy.
Sports - silver Toyota Soarer
Van - black Onebox Nissan Vanette - - similar to the Diaclone Ironhide toy.
Wagon - blue Toyota Hilux - similar to the Diaclone Trailbreaker toy.

Insectors
Crawler - stag beetle - licensed from Beetras Beet-Gadol
Creepy - longhorn beetle - original toy
Morphus - locust - licensed from Beetras Beet-Gadol
Scorpio - scorpion - original toy
Tenticus - spider - original toy

Maladroids
Standard Maladroids
Nofka - licensed from Super Dimension Century Orguss
SDF-1 - space ship - licensed from Super Dimensional Fortress Macross
Sunyak - leader of the Maladroids, licensed from Super Dimension Century Orguss
Zardak - VF-1 jet fighter - licensed from Super Dimensional Fortress Macross
Zark - VF-1S jet fighter - licensed from Super Dimensional Fortress Macross
Mini-Motorized Maladroids
Meeshak - grey jet
Mooriah - white jet
Turak - blue jet
Volcan - red jet

On display

One of the hotels in Walt Disney World is called Disney's Pop Century Resort, which has different buildings from different decades of the latter half of the 1900s. In the lobby are a series of shadow boxes with memorabilia from each decade. In one from the 1980s are various items including a Convertors Sunyak robot.

References

Products introduced in 1984
Action figures
Defunct brands
Toy brands
1980s toys
Transforming toy robots